Jesper Lind Faurschou (born 1 July 1983) is a Danish athlete. He is a part of Herning Running Club, Herning Løbeklub, located in Herning. However, he is currently living in Århus.

In 2007 he set a Danish record. He was the first ever to win 5 individual championships in one year – 10 km road, 4 km cross country, half marathon, 5000 metres and 10000 metres.

In 2008 he participated in the IAAF World Half Marathon Championships, the IAAF World Cross Country Championships (finishing in 127th), and the European Cross Country Championships.

In 2009 he set yet another Danish record, being the first male to win the Winter Tournament three times in a row. The Winter Tournament is a series of 7 runs - either cross country running or road racing.

In 2010, he finished in 29th at the European Championships.

At the 2011 World Championships, he finished in 33rd in the marathon.

He participated in the 2012 Summer Olympics in the marathon finishing 41st.

He competed in the world half marathon championships in 2014, held in Copenhagen, finishing in 62nd.  At the 2014 European Championships, he finished in 22nd.

At the end of the year 2020 he set a Danish record at 50 km.

Records
 1500 metres: 3.51,39 min
 3000 metres: 8.11,98 min
 5000 metres: 14.15,56 min
 10000 metres: 29.42,56 min
 10K: 29.40 min
 Half marathon: 1.04.01 hours
 Marathon: 2.16.15 hours
 50K 2.58.31 hours

References

1983 births
Living people
Danish male middle-distance runners
Danish male long-distance runners
Danish male marathon runners
World Athletics Championships athletes for Denmark
Olympic athletes of Denmark
Athletes (track and field) at the 2012 Summer Olympics
Olympic male marathon runners
21st-century Danish people